Noravank Sport Club, was a football club based in Vayk, Armenia, which played in the Armenian Premier League.

History
Noravank Sport Club was founded in 2020.

League and cup

Grounds

Noravank currently train and hold their home matches at the Charentsavan City Stadium whilst renovation work is carried out on their Vayk Stadium.

Final squad

Honours
 Armenian First League
  Third Place (1): 2020–21
 Armenian Cup
  Winner (1): 2021–22

Managerial history

References

Noravank SC
Noravank